Opdahl is a Norwegian surname that derives from Old Norse Uppdalr (uppi; "up" and dale;"valley"). Notable people with the surname include:

 Andreas Lothe Opdahl (born 1964), Norwegian computer scientist and professor of Information Systems Development
 Iren Opdahl (born  1974), Norwegian politician
 Jacob Opdahl (1894–1938), Norwegian Olympic gymnast 
 Nils Opdahl (1882–1951 ), Norwegian Olympic gymnast
 Ørnulf Opdahl, (born 1944), Norwegian painter and educator
 Einar Opdahl, resident of Entwistle, Alberta who found a diamond in the Pembina River
 Johannes Opdahl, Norwegian carver who worked at the Nidaros Cathedral West Front

References